Angelo Rizzoli, OML (31 October 1889 – 24 September 1970) was an Italian publisher and film producer.

Early life
Rizzoli was born in Milan on 31 October 1889. Orphaned at a young age and raised in poverty, he rose to prosperity. He apprenticed in the printer trade and later became an entrepreneur in his twenties.

Career
In 1927, Rizzoli founded the company A. Rizzoli & Co. (later RCS MediaGroup). In 1927 Rizzoli acquired Novella magazine, a bi-weekly primarily for women that reached a circulation of 130,000 copies, from Mondadori an independent publisher who specialized in books and magazines. After his initial purchase, he added several new publications including Annabella, Bertoldo, Candido, Omnibus, and Oggi e L'Europeo. In 1949 he began publishing books including both classics and popular novels. He purchased Cartiera di Lama di Reno in 1954, the foundation for what would become an Italian publishing empire. His operations were moved in 1960 to a complex on Via Civitavecchia in Milan.

He was amongst the first producers of daily newspapers within the relatively newly established nation of Italy.

Active in film, he had control of the French company Francinex with which he co-produced Federico Fellini's La Dolce Vita (1960) and 8½ (1963), as well as French films such as Une Parisienne (1957). In 1964 Rizzoli opened the original Rizzoli International Bookstore in New York City at 712 Fifth Avenue, designed by architect Ferdinand Gottlieb. The bookstore was featured in various Hollywood films, most notably, Woody Allen's Manhattan and Falling in Love with Robert De Niro and Meryl Streep. He also produced the controversial documentary film Africa Addio.

A museum about Rizzoli's life and career is located at Villa Arbusto within the guest house of that place, at Lacco Ameno. Within this are held 500 photographic-records or evidence of his activities taken on-set during production. The museum also holds the Pithekoussai Archaeological Museum.

Personal life
Rizzoli married Anna Marzorati with whom he had two children, Andrea and Giuseppina. Rizzoli died aged 81 years of age.

Selected filmography
 Red Roses (1940)
 We're Dancing on the Rainbow (1952)
 The Two Orphans (1954)
 Madame Butterfly (1954)
 Madame du Barry (1954)
 Paris, Palace Hotel (1956)
 La Dolce Vita (1960)
 All the Gold in the World (1961)
 8½ (1963)

References

External links

Le Grandi Famiglie: I Rizzoli by Mariateresa Truncellito 

1889 births
1970 deaths
Italian film producers
Newspaper chain founders
Angelo
Film people from Milan
David di Donatello winners
Nastro d'Argento winners
Italian publishers (people)
Italian book publishers (people)
Italian magazine founders